Kaiavere may refer to places in Estonia:

 Kaiavere, Jõgeva County, village in Jõgeva County, Estonia
 Kaiavere, Tartu County, village in Tartu County, Estonia
 Lake Kaiavere, lake in Otslava village Tabivere Parish, Jõgeva County